Aleksander Klumberg (since 1936 Kolmpere; 17 April 1899 – 10 February 1958) was an Estonian decathlete. He competed in several events at the 1920 and 1924 Olympics and won a bronze medal in the decathlon in 1924. In 1922 he became the first official world record holder in the decathlon, albeit with a performance inferior to the Stockholm 1912 series of Jim Thorpe.

Klumberg took up athletics around 1912, and in 1915–1917 held Russian records in several jumping and throwing events. Besides athletics he won three Estonian titles in bandy. In 1918–19 he fought in the Estonian War of Independence as a volunteer, and after that worked as a physical education instructor with the Estonian army (1919–20), military schools (1924–1926) and police schools (1927 and 1942–1944). He also trained the national athletics teams of Poland (1927–1932) and Estonia, and in this capacity attended the 1928, 1932 and 1936 Olympics. He was arrested by NKVD in 1944 and kept in a prison camp in the Soviet Far East until 1956. He is buried at the Rahumäe cemetery in Tallinn.

References

External links
 
 
 
 

1899 births
1958 deaths
Athletes from Tallinn
People from the Governorate of Estonia
Estonian pentathletes
Estonian decathletes
Olympic bronze medalists for Estonia
Athletes (track and field) at the 1920 Summer Olympics
Athletes (track and field) at the 1924 Summer Olympics
Olympic athletes of Estonia
Medalists at the 1924 Summer Olympics
Olympic bronze medalists in athletics (track and field)
Estonian military personnel of the Estonian War of Independence
Burials at Rahumäe Cemetery
Olympic decathletes